Spoto Family Wines is an ultra-boutique winery in Sacramento, California that is owned and operated by the Spoto Family. The winemaker, Stuart Spoto, makes Bordeaux-style blends with grapes from the Oakville Station (part of the historic To Kalon vineyard) in Oakville (the heart of the Napa Valley).

Stuart's grandfather, Enrico Rodolfo Spoto, Sr., immigrated to the United States on December 1, 1913 from Catania, Sicily at the age of 15. He moved to California, where he started a family and ran a fruit and nut tree nursery. His son, Henry Spoto, Jr., a first generation Italian-American, taught himself to make wine. At the age of 16, Henry's son Stuart expressed an interest in the process. Henry, at the time a Cal-Trans appraiser, made wine only in his spare time. Over time, Henry began spending more time making wine and seeking advice from the experts at the University of California at Davis' Viticulture and Enology Department. In the early years, Henry and Stuart learned the techniques and chemistry necessary to make good wines. Stuart later attended the University of California at Davis and studied chemical and civil engineering. Winemaking became a hobby for both men, and in 2000, they began creating their own individual vintages.

In 2004, Stuart built and licensed the first bonded winery in a residential neighborhood in Sacramento County. This allowed Stuart to sell his wines.

By 2010, Stuart took the wine business on full-time. In November 2010 Spoto Family Wines was invited to be a member of the Oakville Wine Growers Association which promotes the Oakville AVA as the premier Cabernet region in the US.  A year later Spoto Family Wines was granted membership into the Napa Valley Vintners, an organization that promotes the wines from the Napa Valley region.

The whole family is involved with the winery. Stuart's wife Christy is an integral part of the day-to-day operations and production at the winery.  Stuart's oldest daughter, Arianna, graduated in 2011 from California Polytechnic University at San Luis Obispo with a degree in wine and viticulture. She has worked with the wine distribution, and is currently working in the industry in Napa Valley and Australia.  His youngest daughter, Alexi, manages the winery's public relations and social media accounts.

Spoto Family Wines were served at two major wine events in 2012: The Napa Valley Auction where Spoto Family Wines was part of a live auction item raising $150k for charity and a Taste of Oakville at Carnegie Hall where Spoto poured his wines in the historic Carnegie Hall in New York.

Many articles in both local and national publications have been written regarding Spoto Family Wines and the Spoto family:

 June 2003 Wine Spectator - "Grapes for Glory" 
 May 2007 Sacramento Bee - "Winery Feels Right at Home" 
 Nov 2009 Sacramento Magazine - "The Winemaker Nextdoor" 
 April 2011 Sacramento Bee - "Spoto Surprises At Elite Tasting" 
 Sept/Oct 2011 Imbibe Magazine - "Garage Winemaking Goes Ligit" 
 March 2012 Sacramento Bee - "Arden Oaks' Spoto Expanding"

References

External links

Wineries in California
Napa Valley